The Wairoa River runs north into Tauranga Harbour at the western end of the Bay of Plenty in New Zealand's North Island.

Hydroelectric power

In the mid-1970s the Tauranga Joint Generation Committee proposed a hydroelectric power scheme for the Wairoa River. The newly formed Kaimai Canoe Club (established by Barry Anderson, Bill Ross, Kerry Smith and Peter Entwistle) opposed the scheme  at the water rights headings, this was on the grounds that it would destroy fishing, sport and recreation for existing and future generations. A compromise was arrived at by allowing the release of water 26 days a year for whitewater recreation. The last dam diverts water around the river bed to the Ruahihi Power Station.

TrustPower is now the manager of the power scheme on the river.

Whitewater recreation
Every year in February the upper section of the river is home to a kayak extreme whitewater race. The first day is a sprint down to bottom of The Waterfall. The second day is head to head racing down the Grade V Waterfall and Rollercoaster.

The whitewater starts at McLaren Falls, a seven-metre Grade VI waterfall (usually not paddled). The first one-metre drop is called "Humpty Dumpty", often used as a warm-up.  The first major rapid is "Mother's Nightmare" - a long Grade IV rapid finishing with a 2-metre drop. Then follow the few grade III rapids (Helicopter, Double Trouble & Devils Elbow/Washing Machine). Then comes the two Grade V sections, "Top Waterfall" (a small drop into a hole followed by a three-metre drop) and Roller Coaster. After that there is a Grade III rock garden, a Whitewater Slalom gorge and few short grade III rapids leading up to the grade III "Bottom Waterfall" (another two metre drop).

See also
Rivers of New Zealand
Kaituna River

References

External links
Environment Bay of Plenty - live river flow telemetry data
Whitewater NZ River Guide - information on the Wairoa River
Kaimai Canoe Club - Local kayak organisation

Rivers of the Bay of Plenty Region
Rivers of New Zealand